The parish of Kilcalmonell is situated in Argyll and Bute, Scotland. It extends from Clachan, in Kintyre to Kilberry, in Knapdale.

References
W. & A.K. Johnston; The Gazetteer of Scotland 1882.

Civil parishes of Scotland